A list of films produced by the Bollywood film industry based in Mumbai in 1998:

Highest-grossing films

List of released films

References

External links
 Bollywood films of 1998 at the Internet Movie Database

1998
Lists of 1998 films by country or language
 Bollywood
1998 in Indian cinema